is a Japanese politician of the Liberal Democratic Party, a member of the House of Councillors in the Diet (national legislature). A graduate of Waseda University, he was elected to the House of Councillors for the first time in 2004 after serving in the assembly of Ehime Prefecture for six terms since 1983.

In October 2015 Yamamoto was appointed state minister of land, infrastructure, transport and tourism, state minister of the Cabinet Office of Japan and state minister for reconstruction, he was active in these posts until August 2016.

References 

Members of the House of Councillors (Japan)
Waseda University alumni
1954 births
Living people
Liberal Democratic Party (Japan) politicians
People from Imabari, Ehime
Politicians from Ehime Prefecture